The Australian Defence Force Cadets (ADFC) (also known as the Australian Service Cadet Scheme until 2001) consists of three Australian Defence Force affiliated, community-based, youth development organisations of approximately 22,000 cadets and 2,200 cadet staff in 464 units and squadrons across Australia. Coordination of the Australian Defence Force Cadets is via the ADF HQ unit called Reserve and Youth Division, with Commander ADF Cadets - directly accountable to VCDF. The ADFC is funded by the Australian Government through the Department of Defence, in partnership with the community.

The Australian Defence Force Cadets have been a large part of the Australian community since the 19th century. After the cadets were re-raised in 1976 the three cadet services were grouped together as the Australian Services Cadet Scheme, beforehand the three organisations were run under the directions of single service policy, in 2001 the name was changed to the Australian Defence Force Cadets as recommended by a review. While the Australian Defence Force Cadets is sponsored by ADF (Australian Defence Force) and runs under a similar rank structure, uniform and training activities, the ADFC is not an official branch of the Defence Force and runs in accordance with the Optional Protocol on the Involvement of Children in Armed Conflict which Australia has signed.

The ADFC encompasses three organizations:
 Australian Navy Cadets (ANC)
 Australian Army Cadets (AAC)
 Australian Air Force Cadets (AAFC)

Cadet units are referred to differently depending on the parent service. Air Force Cadet units are referred to as Squadrons, Navy Cadet units are referred to as Training Ships and Army Cadet units are referred to as Army Cadet Units.

ADFC Ranks

Officer of Cadets (OOC) ranks

Instructor of Cadets (IOC) ranks

Cadets ranks

See also 
 National Cadet Advisory Council
 Ranks of the Junior Reserve Officers' Training Corps
 Cadet grades and insignia of the Civil Air Patrol
 Ranks of the cadet forces of the United Kingdom
 Cadets Canada elemental ranks
 New Zealand Cadet Forces ranks

References

External links
 http://www.cadetnet.gov.au/
 http://www.aac.adfc.gov.au/
 http://www.airforcecadets.gov.au/

Youth organisations based in Australia
Australian cadet organisations